Luis Paulino Mora Mora (April 8, 1944 – February 17, 2013) was a Costa Rican judge. He was the President of the Supreme Court of Costa Rica from July 12, 1999 until his death in 2013.

References

External links
www.iadb.org

20th-century Costa Rican judges
1944 births
2013 deaths
People from San José, Costa Rica
Supreme Court of Justice of Costa Rica judges
21st-century Costa Rican judges